John Farquhar (1751–1826) was a Scottish millionaire dealer in gunpowder.

Early life
Farquhar was born of humble parents at Bilbo, in the parish of Crimond, Aberdeenshire. At 15 he had a bursary to attend Marischal College, Aberdeen, studied there for four years, and graduated M.A. He went to London, and then sought his fortune in the East, taking a place on an East Indiaman as surgeon's mate. He found work in a Bengal merchant's office in Barrackpore.

Picking up chemistry as a hobby, Farquhar found it a business asset. Gunpowder was being manufactured at Pultah, a reach of the Hooghly River about two miles inland from Barrackpore. It had been found unsatisfactory, and Farquhar was chosen by General Cornwallis, governor-general of Bengal, to look into it. He was made superintendent of the factory, and ultimately became sole contractor to the government. He became wealthy, influential, and on good terms with Warren Hastings.

In England
Farquhar returned to England in 1814, with a fortune of about £500,000. It was invested by Hoare's Bank in government funds.

Stories attached to Farquhar, who spent little on himself. Farquhar was taken for a beggar in the street. On landing at Gravesend he is said to have walked to London in order to save coach hire, and arrived at his banker's so covered with dust and so poorly clad that the clerks allowed him to wait in the cash office until Mr. Hoare passed through, and recognised him. Farquhar took up residence in Upper Baker Street, Portman Square. His sole attendant was an old woman, and the house was conspicuous for its neglected appearance. Though miserly in his personal habits, he was fond of attending auction sales, and bidding in them. Despite idiosyncrasies, his manners were affable and pleasant.

At the same time Farquhar was princely in charitable contributions. He became a partner in the agency house of Basset, Farquhar, & Co. in the city, and purchased a share in the Whitbread brewery. His wealth, as it accumulated, was devoted partly to the purchase of estates, but more was invested. In 1822 he purchased Fonthill Abbey from William Thomas Beckford for £330,000, and he occasionally resided there until the fall of the tower in December 1825, shortly after which he sold the estate.

Besides knowledge of chemistry, Farquhar was an accomplished classical scholar, and also excelled in mathematics and mechanics. His beliefs included admiration of the moral system of Hinduism. He wished to expend £100,000 for the foundation of a college in Aberdeen, with a reservation in regard to religion; but lacking parliamentary sanction the scheme was not carried out.

Death and legacy
Farquhar died suddenly of apoplexy on 6 July 1826. His wealth amounted to about £1.5 million. He left no will, and it was divided among his seven nephews and nieces. He was buried in St John's Wood Church, London with a monument to him by Peter Rouw.

References

Attribution

1751 births
1826 deaths
18th-century Scottish businesspeople
19th-century Scottish businesspeople
People from Buchan
Scottish expatriates in India
Scottish chemists
Scottish art collectors